Igor Nikolayevich Khokhlov (Russian name: Игорь Хохлов; born 8 April 1937) is a Soviet rower. He competed at the 1960 Summer Olympics in Rome with the men's coxed four where they came fourth. He later worked as a rowing coach.

References

1937 births
Living people
Soviet male rowers
Olympic rowers of the Soviet Union
Rowers at the 1960 Summer Olympics
Rowers from Saint Petersburg
European Rowing Championships medalists